A vehicle frame, also historically known as its chassis, is the main supporting structure of a motor vehicle to which all other components are attached, comparable to the skeleton of an organism.

Until the 1930s, virtually every car had a structural frame separate from its body. This construction design is known as body-on-frame. By the 1960s, unibody construction in passenger cars had become common, and the trend to unibody for passenger cars continued over the ensuing decades. 

Nearly all trucks, buses, and most pickups continue to use a separate frame as their chassis.

Functions
The main functions of a frame in a motor vehicle are:
 To support the vehicle's mechanical components and body
 To deal with static and dynamic loads, without undue deflection or distortion
These include:
Weight of the body, passengers, and cargo loads.
Vertical and torsional twisting transmitted by going over uneven surfaces
Transverse lateral forces caused by road conditions, side wind, and steering of the vehicle
Torque from the engine and transmission
Longitudinal tensile forces from starting and acceleration, as well as compression from braking
Sudden impacts from collisions

Frame rails

Typically the material used to construct vehicle chassis and frames include carbon steel for strength or aluminum alloys to achieve a more lightweight construction. In the case of a separate chassis, the frame is made up of structural elements called the rails or beams. These are ordinarily made of steel channel sections, made by folding, rolling, or pressing steel plate.

There are three main designs for these. If the material is folded twice, an open-ended cross-section, either C-shaped or hat-shaped (U-shaped) results.
"Boxed" frames contain chassis rails that are closed, either by somehow welding them up or by using premanufactured metal tubing.

C-Shaped 
By far the most common, the C-channel rail has been used on nearly every type of vehicle at one time or another. It is made by taking a flat piece of steel (usually ranging in thickness from 1/8" to 3/16", but up to 1/2" or more in some heavy-duty trucks) and rolling both sides over to form a C-shaped beam running the length of the vehicle.

Hat 
Hat frames resemble a "U" and may be either right-side-up or inverted with the open area facing down. They are not commonly used due to weakness and a propensity to rust. However, they can be found on 1936–1954 Chevrolet cars and some Studebakers.

Abandoned for a while, the hat frame regained popularity when companies started welding it to the bottom of unibody cars, effectively creating a boxed frame.

Boxed 

Originally, boxed frames were made by welding two matching C-rails together to form a rectangular tube. Modern techniques, however, use a process similar to making C-rails in that a piece of steel is bent into four sides and then welded where both ends meet.

In the 1960s, the boxed frames of conventional American cars were spot-welded in multiple places down the seam; when turned into NASCAR "stock car" racers, the box was continuously welded from end to end for extra strength.

Design features
While appearing at first glance as a simple form made of metal, frames encounter great amounts of stress and are built accordingly. The first issue addressed is "beam height", or the height of the vertical side of a frame. The taller the frame, the better it is able to resist vertical flex when force is applied to the top of the frame. This is the reason semi-trucks have taller frame rails than other vehicles instead of just being thicker.

As looks, ride quality, and handling became more important to consumers, new shapes were incorporated into frames. The most visible of these are arches and kick-ups. Instead of running straight over both axles, arched frames sit lower—roughly level with their axles—and curve up over the axles and then back down on the other side for bumper placement. Kick-ups do the same thing without curving down on the other side and are more common on the front ends.

Another feature are the tapered rails that narrow vertically or horizontally in front of a vehicle's cabin. This is done mainly on trucks to save weight and slightly increase room for the engine since the front of the vehicle does not bear as much of a load as the back. Design developments include frames that use more than one shape in the same frame rail. For example, some pickup trucks have a boxed frame in front of the cab, shorter, narrower rails underneath the cab, and regular C-rails under the bed.

On perimeter frames, the areas where the rails connect from front to center and center to rear are weak compared to regular frames, so that section is boxed in, creating what are called "torque boxes".

Types

Full under-body frames

Ladder frame

Named for its resemblance to a ladder, the ladder frame is one of the oldest, simplest, and most frequently used under-body, separate chassis/frame designs. It consists of two symmetrical beams, rails, or channels, running the length of the vehicle, connected by several transverse cross-members. Originally seen on almost all vehicles, the ladder frame was gradually phased out on cars in favor of perimeter frames and unitized body construction. It is now seen mainly on large trucks. This design offers good beam resistance because of its continuous rails from front to rear, but poor resistance to torsion or warping if simple, perpendicular cross-members are used. The vehicle's overall height will be greater due to the floor pan sitting above the frame instead of inside it.

Backbone tube

A backbone chassis is a type of automotive construction with chassis, that is similar to the body-on-frame design. Instead of a relatively flat, ladder-like structure with two longitudinal, parallel frame rails, it consists of a singular central, strong tubular backbone (usually rectangular in cross-section), that carries the power-train, and connects the front and rear suspension attachment structures. Although the backbone is frequently drawn upward into, and mostly above the floor of the vehicle, the body is still placed on or over (sometimes straddling) this structure from above.

X-frame

This is the design used for the full-size American models of General Motors in the late 1950s and early 1960s in which the rails from alongside the engine seemed to cross in the passenger compartment, each continuing to the opposite end of the crossmember at the extreme rear of the vehicle. It was specifically chosen to decrease the overall height of the vehicles regardless of the increase in the size of the transmission and propeller shaft humps since each row had to cover frame rails as well. Several models had the differential located not by the customary bar between axle and frame, but by a ball joint atop the differential connected to a socket in a wishbone hinged onto a crossmember of the frame.

The X-frame was claimed to improve on previous designs, but it lacked side rails and thus did not provide adequate side impact and collision protection.
This design was replaced by perimeter frames.

Perimeter frame

Similar to a ladder frame, but the middle sections of the frame rails sit outboard of the front and rear rails, routed around the passenger footwells, inside the rocker and sill panels. This allowed the floor pan to be lowered, especially the passenger footwells, lowering the passengers' seating height and thereby reducing both the roof-line and overall vehicle height, as well as the center of gravity, thus improving handling and road-holding in passenger cars.

This became the prevalent design for body-on-frame cars in the United States, but not in the rest of the world, until the unibody gained popularity. For example, Hudson introduced this construction on their 3rd generation Commodore models in 1948. This frame type allowed for annual model changes, and lower cars, introduced in the 1950s to increase sales – without costly structural changes. 

The Ford Panther platform, discontinued in 2011, was one of the last perimeter frame passenger car platforms in the United States. The fourth to seventh generation Chevrolet Corvette used a perimeter frame integrated with an internal skeleton that serves as a clamshell.

In addition to a lowered roof, the perimeter frame allows lower seating positions when that is desirable, and offers better safety in the event of a side impact. However, the design lacks stiffness, because the transition areas from front to center and center to rear reduce beam and torsional resistance, and is used in combination with torque boxes and soft suspension settings.

Platform frame

This is a modification of the perimeter frame, or of the backbone frame, in which the passenger compartment floor, and sometimes also the luggage compartment floor, have been integrated into the frame as loadbearing parts, for strength and rigidity. The sheet metal used to assemble the components needs to be stamped with ridges and hollows to give it strength.

Platform chassis were used on several successful European cars, most notably the Volkswagen Beetle, where it was called "body-on-pan" construction. Another German example are the Mercedes-Benz "Ponton" cars of the 1950s and 1960s, where it was called a "frame floor" in English-language advertisements.

The French Renault 4, of which over eight million were made, also used a platform frame. The frame of the Citroën 2CV used a very minimal interpretation of a platform chassis under its body.

Space frame

In a (tubular) spaceframe chassis, the suspension, engine, and body panels are attached to a three-dimensional skeletal frame of tubes, and the body panels have limited or no structural function. To maximize rigidity and minimize weight, the design frequently makes maximum use of triangles, and all the forces in each strut are either tensile or compressive, never bending, so they can be kept as thin as possible.

The first true spaceframe chassis were produced in the 1930s by Buckminster Fuller and William Bushnell Stout (the Dymaxion and the Stout Scarab) who understood the theory of the true spaceframe from either architecture or aircraft design.

The 1951 Jaguar C-Type racing sports car utilized a lightweight, multi-tubular, triangulated frame, over which an aerodynamic aluminum body was crafted.

In 1994, the Audi A8 was the first mass-market car with an aluminium chassis, made feasible by integrating an aluminium space-frame into the bodywork. Audi A8 models have since used this construction method co-developed with Alcoa, and marketed as the Audi Space Frame.

The Italian term Superleggera (meaning 'super-light') was trademarked by Carrozzeria Touring for lightweight sports-car body construction that only resembles a space-frame chassis. Using a three-dimensional frame that consists of a cage of narrow tubes that, besides being under the body, run up the fenders and over the radiator, cowl, and roof, and under the rear window, it resembles a geodesic structure. A skin is attached to the outside of the frame, often made of aluminum. This body construction is, however, not stress-bearing, and still requires the addition of a chassis.

Unibody

The terms "unibody" and "unit-body" are short for "unitized body", "unitary construction", or alternatively (fully) integrated body and frame/chassis. It is defined as:

Vehicle structure has shifted from the traditional body-on-frame architecture to the lighter unitized/integrated body structure that is now used for most cars. 

Integral frame and body construction requires more than simply welding an unstressed body to a conventional frame. In a fully integrated body structure, the entire car is a load-carrying unit that handles all the loads experienced by the vehicle – forces from driving as well as cargo loads. Integral-type bodies for wheeled vehicles are typically manufactured by welding preformed metal panels and other components together, by forming or casting whole sections as one piece, or by a combination of these techniques. Although this is sometimes also referred to as a monocoque structure, because the car's outer skin and panels are made load-bearing, there are still ribs, bulkheads, and box sections to reinforce the body, making the description semi-monocoque more appropriate.

The first attempt to develop such a design technique was on the 1922 Lancia Lambda to provide structural stiffness and a lower body height for its torpedo car body. The Lambda had an open layout with unstressed roof, which made it less of a monocoque shell and more like a bowl. 1,000 were produced.

A key role in developing the unitary body was played by the American firm the Budd Company, now ThyssenKrupp Budd. Budd supplied pressed-steel bodywork, fitted to separate frames, to automakers Dodge, Ford, Buick, and the French company, Citroën.  

In 1930, Joseph Ledwinka, an engineer with Budd, designed an automobile prototype with a full unitary construction.

Citroën purchased this fully unitary body design for the Citroën Traction Avant. This high-volume, mass-production car was introduced in 1934 and sold 760,000 units over the next 23 years of production. This application was the first iteration of the modern structural integration of body and chassis, using spot welded deeply stamped steel sheets into a structural cage, including sills, pillars, and roof beams. In addition to a unitary body with no separate frame, the Traction Avant also featured other innovations such as front-wheel drive. The result was a low-slung vehicle with an open, flat-floored interior.

For the Chrysler Airflow (1934–1937) Budd supplied a variation – three main sections from the Airflow's body were welded into what Chrysler called a bridge-truss construction. Unfortunately, this method was not ideal because the panel fits were poor. To convince a skeptical public of the strength of unibody, both Citroën and Chrysler created advertising films showing cars surviving after being pushed off a cliff.

Opel was the second European and the first German car manufacturer to produce a car with a unibody structure – production of the compact Olympia started in 1935. A larger Kapitän went into production in 1938, although its front longitudinal beams were stamped separately and then attached to the main body. It was so successful, that the Soviet post-war mass produced GAZ-M20 Pobeda of 1946 copied unibody structure from the Opel Kapitän. Later Soviet limousine GAZ-12 ZIM of 1950 introduced unibody design to automobiles with a wheelbase as long as 3.2 m (126 in).

The streamlined 1936 Lincoln-Zephyr with conventional front-engine, rear-wheel-drive layout utilized a unibody structure. By 1941, unit construction was no longer a new idea for cars, "but it was unheard of in the [American] low-price field [and] Nash wanted a bigger share of that market." The single unit-body construction of the Nash 600 provided weight savings and Nash's Chairman and CEO, George W. Mason was convinced "that unibody was the wave of the future."

Since then, more cars were redesigned to the unibody structure, which is now "considered standard in the industry". By 1960, the unitized body design was used by Detroit's Big Three on their compact cars (Ford Falcon, Plymouth Valiant, and Chevrolet Corvair). After Nash merged with Hudson Motors to form American Motors Corporation, its Rambler-badged automobiles continued exclusively building variations of the unibody.

Although the 1934 Chrysler Airflow had a weaker-than-usual frame and body framework welded to the chassis to provide stiffness, in 1960, Chrysler moved from body-on-frame construction to a unit-body design for most of its cars.

Most of the American-manufactured unibody automobiles used torque boxes in their vehicle design to reduce vibrations and chassis flex, with the exception of the Chevy II which had a bolt-on front apron (erroneously referred to as a subframe). American Motors (with its partner Renault) during the late 1970s incorporated unibody construction when designing the Jeep Cherokee (XJ) platform using the manufacturing principles (unisides, floorpan with integrated frame rails and crumple zones, and roof panel) used in its passenger cars, such as the Hornets and all-wheel-drive Eagles for a new type of frame called the "Uniframe [...] a robust stamped steel frame welded to a strong unit-body structure, giving the strength of a conventional heavy frame with the weight advantages of Unibody construction." This design was also used with the XJC concept developed by American Motors prior to its absorption by Chrysler, which later became the Jeep Grand Cherokee (ZJ). The design is still in use in modern-day sport utility vehicles such as the Jeep Grand Cherokee. 

The unibody is now the preferred construction for mass-market automobiles. This design provides weight savings, improved space utilization, and ease of manufacture. Acceptance grew dramatically in the wake of the two energy crises of the 1970s, and that of the 2000s in which compact SUVs using a truck platform (primarily the USA market) were subjected to CAFE standards after 2005 (by the late 2000s truck-based compact SUVs were phased out and replaced with crossovers). An additional advantage of a strong-bodied car lies in the improved crash protection for its passengers.

Partial frames

Subframe

A subframe is a distinct structural frame component, to reinforce or complement a particular section of a vehicle's structure. Typically attached to a unibody or a monocoque, the rigid subframe can handle great forces from the engine and drive train, and can transfer them evenly to a wide area of relatively thin sheet metal of a unitized body shell. Subframes are often found at the front or rear end of cars and are used to attach the suspension to the vehicle. A subframe may also contain the engine and transmission. It is normally of pressed or box steel construction, but may be tubular and/or other material.

Examples of passenger car use include the 1967–1981 GM F platform, the numerous years and models built on the GM X platform (1962), GM's M/L platform vans (Chevrolet Astro/GMC Safari, which included an all-wheel drive variant), and the unibody AMC Pacer that incorporated a front subframe to isolate the passenger compartment from the engine, suspension, and steering loads.

See also
 Bicycle frame
 Body-on-frame
 Chassis
 Coachbuilder
 Locomotive frame
 Monocoque
 Motorcycle frame
 C-channel

References

External links 
 
 What Is the A-Frame on a Car?
 What Is Car frame?

Automotive chassis types
Automotive technologies
Vehicle parts
Structural system
Structural engineering